Mamar Kassey is a jazz-pop-ethnic band from Niger. It is named after Askia Muhammad I, a legendary warrior who extended the Songhai Empire into the Sahara.

Style
The band's leader is singer and flautist Yacouba Moumouni. The group combines traditional Hausa, Djerma, Fula and Songhai rhythms, instruments such as the molo (a lute with a skin-covered body), and modern instruments such as the electric bass.  Their sound also incorporates western jazz, Moroccan and Latin music.

Musical career
An eight-piece group formed by Moumouni and guitarist Abdallah Alhassane in 1995, Mamar Kassey have released two albums internationally and toured Europe and the United States multiple times. They came to attention in France after an appearance at the Festival des Nuits Atypiques in Langon in 1998.

They are one of the few Nigerien musical acts known internationally, and much beloved in their home country.

Makida Palabre
In 2004–2005, musicians from Mamar Kassey toured with a group of Breton folk musicians under the name Makida Palabre. The collaboration included Breton musicians Pierre-Yves Prothais, Ronan Le Gourierec, Laurent Carré, and Youen Paranthoen playing Breton/Celtic, western jazz, and West African instruments.

Musicians
The members of the band have changed over the course of the group's existence. The group that performed at the Festival des nomades in Benin in 2000 included:
Abdoulaye ALASSANE, (ABDALLAH): guitar.
Adamou DAOUDA, (NAGOULI): kalangou.
Boubacar Souleyman MAIGA, (BARI): percussion, calabash.
Harouna ABDOU : electric bass guitar.
Housseïni Namata CHIBAKOU: molo lute.
Yacouba MOUMOUNI: flute, vocals.

Discography
Denké-Denké, Daqui, Harmonia Mundi, (1999)
Alatoumi, Daqui (2000), Harmonia Mundi (2001), World Village WV470003 (2001)
Via Campesina, Daqui, Harmonia Mundi (2006)
On va voir ça, Daqui, Harmonia Mundi (forthcoming, 2008)
Niger, Innacor Records, (2013)

References

 collection of reviews and interviews for Mondomix program, at TV5Monde.  Includes extensive history of the group
 Interview by Pierre René-Worms, 2006, Radio France International. At the Ferveur Gnaoua Festival in Mogador, Morocco.
BBC:  Mamar Kassey Alatoumi. Reviewed by Peter Marsh. 20 November 2002.
Afropop Worldwide: Mamar Kassey, Alatoumi. Reviewed by Banning Eyre, 2001.
SONG OF THE SAHEL. Dan Maley, Macon Telegraph (Georgia, USA),2004-09-03, Page 3.
 Video and biography at TV5Monde.

External links
photos from the Fêt'arts festival in Burkina Faso, 2003.
 Performance at the Alliance Franco-Marocaine d'El Jadida, Morocco (2007).
 Radio programs and performance photos, 2006 at Radio France International.

Nigerien musical groups